Odostomia suboblonga is a species of sea snail, a marine gastropod mollusk in the family Pyramidellidae, the pyrams and their allies.

Description
The size of an adult shell varies between 1.9 mm and 3 mm.

Distribution
This species occurs in the following locations:
 Canary Islands
 Cape Verde
 Europe
 European waters (ERMS scope)
 Madeira
 Central Mediterranean Sea
 Morocco
 Portuguese Exclusive Economic Zone
 Spanish Exclusive Economic Zone
 United Kingdom Exclusive Economic Zone

References

External links
 To Biodiversity Heritage Library (6 publications)
 To CLEMAM
 To Encyclopedia of Life
 To USNM Invertebrate Zoology Mollusca Collection
 

suboblonga
Gastropods described in 1884
Molluscs of the Atlantic Ocean
Molluscs of the Mediterranean Sea
Molluscs of Madeira
Molluscs of the Canary Islands
Gastropods of Cape Verde